KSHO (920 AM, "Unforgettable 920") is a radio station licensed to serve Lebanon, Oregon, United States. The station, which began broadcasting in 1951, is currently owned by the Eads Broadcasting Corporation.

Programming
KSHO broadcasts an adult standards music format featuring the "America's Best Music" programming from Dial Global.

In addition to its usual music programming, throughout 2009, KSHO and sister station KGAL aired a series of one-minute historical vignettes as part of Oregon's sesquicentennial celebration.  The program, titled A Moment in Oregon History, highlighted key events in Oregon history and notable Oregon residents.  Each of the 240 vignettes was written by author Rick Steber.

History

The beginning
This station began broadcasting in 1951 with 1,000 watts of power on 930 kHz as KGAL under the ownership of W. Gordon Allen's Linn County Broadcasting Company. Part of the Allen Stations Group, KGAL shifted frequencies to the current 920 kHz in 1954.

On July 1, 1961, Allen sold KGAL to the Stadler Stations Group through their Radio Wonderland Willamette, Inc., subsidiary. Stadler held onto the station through the end of the 1960s.

The fact that the station had a low dial position it was able to get a lot out of 1000 watts of power. It had to protect other stations on 920 in Spokane and Olympia, WA so going north you lost them just past Salem where Portland's KISN (910) splashed over. The signal was more than sufficient for them to cover the tri-cities of Albany, Lebanon, and Corvallis. The fact that they were directionalized west and south gave them almost a city-grade signal in Eugene and you could take them almost to the Oregon coast.

The station called itself K-Gal with a downhome country format. The "K-Gal Rancho" along Highway 20 on the outskirts of Lebanon was a familiar local landmark.

The 1970s
KGAL was purchased by Lebanon Broadcasting, Inc., in 1970. This put the Bend Bulletin newspaper into the operating position, but they knew well enough to bring in radio people to run KGAL. They changed the station to Top 40 and soon Carl Reynolds came in as general manager. Under his leadership the station vaulted past KRKT in Albany and pushed KASH (Eugene) out of the market.

92-KGAL peaked in 1972 using the moniker "The Rock of The Valley." Veteran programmer Jim Edwards (Dick Poirier) put together a strong air staff, however the market was too small to keep these guys around for long. The "White Rabbit" Jerry Vance did the morning show. In middays there was Eddie Beacon, who later became a big radio star in Knoxville, TN. He was replaced by Ernie Hopsecker using the name John W. Roberts is now a successful station owner based in Salem, OR. Edwards handled PM drive until his departure when Dusty Brooks, whom Edwards had hired in Providence, took that shift. His air name was Todd Martin. From there Brooks went on to Chicago's WGLD-FM where he was Music Director and handled the 6-10 PM shift. The station's news director was Jim Brinson out of Eugene who springboarded to Pittsburgh where he became a popular TV sportscaster and a member of the Pittsburgh Pirates broadcast team. Years later Brinson ended up in Buffalo. Another huge talent was J. Parker Antrim out of Missoula, MT who took over the morning show when Vance departed. From KGAL he took his unique act to Columbus, OH and then to San Francisco where he worked at some prestigious stations including legendary KYA.

In late 1972 Sam Lee stepped in as Program Director and worked on the air as "Super Shannon." During his tenure Western Communications acquired KGAL from Lebanon Broadcasting, Inc., in 1973.  The new owners maintained the Top 40 music format but the ownership change proved short-lived. Soon after Lee left for Pueblo, CO and KDZA, KGAL was acquired by Juniper Broadcasting in November 1974. In March 1979, Juniper Broadcasting changed its name to Capps Broadcasting Group, Inc. The Top 40 format was maintained through the sale in 1981.

The Eads era
In July 1981, Capps Broadcasting Group, Inc., reached an agreement to sell this station to the Eads Broadcasting Corporation.  The deal was approved by the FCC on September 17, 1981.

The station was assigned the KSHO call letters by the Federal Communications Commission on November 1, 1991.

References

External links
KSHO official website
FCC History Cards for KSHO

SHO
Adult standards radio stations in the United States
Radio stations established in 1951
Lebanon, Oregon
1951 establishments in Oregon